Annie is a soundtrack to the 2014 film of the same name, released by Roc Nation, Overbrook Entertainment, Madison Gate Records and RCA Records on November 17, 2014. The soundtrack's executive producer was Greg Kurstin, who also collaborated with Sia to create new arrangements for three songs from the original Broadway production of Annie: "I Think I'm Gonna Like It Here", "You're Never Fully Dressed Without a Smile" and "Little Girls." Additionally, Sia and Kurstin wrote three new songs for the soundtrack, including "Opportunity", "Who Am I?" and "Moonquake Lake" featuring Beck.

Singles
"You're Never Fully Dressed Without A Smile" by Sia was released as the lead single on October 22, 2014.

"Opportunity" by Sia was released as the second single. It officially impacted Hot/Modern/AC radio on January 19, 2015.

In July 2021, the song "Little Girls" by Cameron Diaz started to go viral on TikTok, appearing in many videos.

Reception
Vulture Lindsey Weber called Sia's "You're Never Fully Dressed Without a Smile" "different" and wrote, "If you push the original deep into the back of your brain, her modern-day modified version seems to work."

Track listing

Charts

Weekly charts

Year-end charts

References
Footnotes

Sources

2014 soundtrack albums
 Albums produced by Greg Kurstin
 Comedy film soundtracks
 Little Orphan Annie
 Madison Gate Records soundtracks
 Musical film soundtracks
 RCA Records soundtracks
Roc Nation soundtracks